Cassinelli may refer to:

People
Claudio Cassinelli (1938-1985), Italian actor
Dave Casinelli (1940-1987), American football player
Lindsay Casinelli, Venezuelan journalist
Roberto Cassinelli, Italian politician
Dolores Cassinelli, (1888-1984), American film actress
Ricardo Belmont Cassinelli, Peruvian media owner

Other
Enrique Cassinelli and Sons, Peruvian soft-drink producer
Cassinelli (soft drink), Peruvian soft-drink